Xi Beach is situated in the south of the Paliki peninsula of Kefalonia, Greece, and part of the district Mantzavinata near the town of Lixouri.

Location 
Its location can be seen in Google Maps.

Several roads branch on the approach to the area and bring one out at different locations along its length, usually close to a bar, taverna or apartment complex.

Character
Xi is renowned for its soft, red sand. It is a Blue Flag beach. 
The sand slopes reasonably gently so that one can go out a distance from the shoreline. The areas of the beach that are close to hotels are developed and organised with beach loungers and sun shades. Areas that are away from amenities present a more natural aspect.

Geology
The surrounding sediment and cliffs at Xi Beach are made up of a white clay, which is eroded into sharp profiles by the rain. The beach is made up of a soft, red sand.

Travel and amenities
Well-made roads lead down to the beach areas. At the end of the roads, car parking is located on-road or in car parks linked with Tavernas. This can be crowded at the height of the tourist season. There are several large Tavernas providing drinks and meals along the  length of the beach area. Beach loungers and umbrellas are for hire in some areas of the beach, usually at points where hotels, Tavernas or bars are situated close to the beach. The area has some hotel complexes and apartments. The beaches are associated with a high population density of tourists in high season. In September the number of tourists decreases significantly, with continuation of good weather.

References

External links
 3600 movie of the beach from Greeka

Tourist attractions in the Ionian Islands (region)
Landforms of Cephalonia
Beaches of Greece
Landforms of the Ionian Islands (region)